David Syme (2 October 1827 – 14 February 1908) was a Scottish-Australian newspaper proprietor of The Age and regarded as "the father of protection in Australia" who had immense influence in the Government of Victoria. His first biographer, Ambrose Pratt, declared Syme "could hate as few men can [and] loved power as few men ever loved it".

Early life and family
Syme was born at North Berwick in Scotland, the youngest of the seven children and fourth son of George Alexander Syme (18?–1845), a parish schoolmaster. Syme's wife, David's mother, was Jean née Mitchell. George Syme was a radical in church and state, his income was comfortable yet moderate, but it was stretched to provide for his large family and send three of his sons to universities (which he successfully did, while providing David with a relentlessly demanding education himself.) David Syme's childhood was one of study with little companionship with other boys of his own age. George Syme was not physically unkind to his sons, but Syme would write later: "It was difficult to understand my father's attitude to we boys. He had naturally a kind disposition; he was a devoted husband and no-one ever asked him for help that he did not freely give … but his affection for us never found expression in words".

Syme married Annabella Garnett-Johnson, of the Lancashire Garnett family of Waddow Hall, Clitheroe, England. Annabella was connected through her Garnett relations to William Garnett.

David Syme was 17 years old when his father died and he continued his classical studies with some doubt to his future. He had thoughts of qualifying for the ministry but revolted from the Calvinistic teaching of the day; his brothers George and Ebenezer had renounced the Church of Scotland.

Syme studied under James Morison at Kilmarnock for two years, attended some classes at Heidelberg and returned to Scotland obtaining a position about 1850 as a proofreader's assistant on a Glasgow newspaper. With low pay and little prospect of advancement, he sailed for San Francisco by way of Cape Horn in 1851 and arrived after a voyage of five months to search for gold but had little success.

Australia
Early in 1852 Syme sailed for Australia in a badly provisioned vessel, and arrived at Sydney in a half-starved condition.

Syme took the first steamer for Melbourne and walked to Castlemaine. Syme had some success there and at the Bendigo, Wangaratta, Ballarat and Beechworth diggings. In 1855, at Mount Egerton, Syme and his partner almost obtained a fortune, but their claim, which afterwards became very valuable, was jumped by other men and they were unable to obtain recompense.

The Age
Towards the end of 1855 Syme returned to Melbourne and became a road contractor.
Syme's brother, Ebenezer, was editing The Age newspaper and when it was threatened with failure bought it for £2000 in June 1856. David Syme, who had saved some money while on the diggings joined his brother as partner in The Age on 27 September 1856. The paper struggled on for 18 months, when finding it could not support the two proprietors David obtained other employment. Ebenezer retired in 1859 and David, with some reluctance, returned to the business. On 13 March 1860 Ebenezer died, and finding it was difficult to sell The Age Syme decided to abandon his contracting and carry on the paper.

The task of running the newspaper was a difficult one, and only the fact that the proprietor was willing to work 15 hours a day made success possible. The original policies of The Age included manhood suffrage, the opening of the lands for selection by the people, no compensation for the squatters, and compulsory, free and secular education. When protection was added to the program great opposition was raised. Opponents felt that these policies would greatly harm the colony. The opposition to The Age was carried even to the extent of boycotting its advertising. Various abortive amending land acts became law between 1860 and 1869, but in the latter year an act was passed which embodied most of the principles for which Syme had fought. A tremendous flow of population came into Victoria between 1850 and 1860 due to the Victorian gold rush and towards the end of the decade there was some unemployment.

Protectionism
Syme felt that manufacturing industries should be established in Victoria and that this could only be done by bringing in trade protection. Syme persuaded able men like Sir James McCulloch and Sir Graham Berry and protectionism became the settled economic policy of the colony; consequently many factories were established.

Syme was a driving force for the introduction of such policies, which accompanied a great increase in economic activity. As a comparison, the neighbouring colony of New South Wales retained a policy which was practically free trade for most of the period before federation, and appears to have been as steadily prosperous as Victoria. Protectionism in Victoria was bitterly opposed and dispute led to great contests between the Victorian Legislative Assembly and the Victorian Legislative Council. The struggle went on for years, but Syme's belief that the people as a whole should rule, rather than any one section of them, was finally established, and for a long period The Age became the predominant factor in Victorian politics. In its early days there was difficulty in getting competent journalists, the best of them was G. Paton Smith who was editor for some years. After Smith left, Syme took the editorial chair until Arthur Windsor became editor in 1872 and held the position until 1900. Possibly Syme's most able assistant was Charles Henry Pearson who began writing leaders around 1875.

Victoria's first protectionist tariff had been a very moderate one and McCulloch was not willing to increase it. Though Syme thought highly of McCulloch's ability, he opposed him and transferred his support to Graham Berry. Parliament was not stable and more than once ministries were formed consisting partly of freetraders and partly of protectionists. This did not satisfy Syme and in 1877 his advocacy brought in Berry with a large majority and popularity to The Age. The Legislative Council, however, rejected Berry's tariff and fresh constitutional difficulties arose. The governor, Sir George Bowen, was placed in a difficult position, and took the unprecedented step of asking Syme's advice. Syme's reply was that the governor should act in conformity with the opinions of the law officers of the crown. This Bowen did but Syme thought the advice was bad and told the premier so. Berry then asked Syme for his advice and took it. It is evident that Syme at this time had very great influence within the colony. Constitutional difficulties continued for some time, but at last the Legislative Council was reformed, by increasing the number of eligible voters and by other changes in its constitution to make it more democratic.

Syme had supported Berry in the fight for protection and during the constitutional struggle, but was not satisfied with him as an administrator. Although opposed to James Service, Syme recognised that Service had the very qualities Berry lacked. Syme therefore supported the coalition ministry formed in 1883 which did good work for three years. There was a general feeling of confidence, a tendency to over-borrow money and to spend huge sums on railways and other public works. This led to the mining and land booms which really burst in 1889, although the full effects were not realised until the bank crisis of 1893. In 1891 The Age began a series of articles alleging bad management and incompetence on the part of the railway commissioners. This led at last to an action for libel being brought against The Age by the chief commissioner, Richard Speight. Other articles attacked the civil service generally. At the first trial of the railway libel case begun on 1 June 1893 the jury disagreed, and the second trial which began on 17 April 1894 and lasted for 105 days resulted in a verdict for the defendant on nine out of the ten counts, and on the tenth count the damages were assessed at one farthing. Speight, however, was ruined and Syme had to pay his own costs which amounted to about £50,000. As an example of the power some felt was exercised by Syme at this time, the leading counsel for the plaintiff, when addressing the jury, stated that "no government could stand against The Age without being shaken to its centre".

Syme had early realised that agriculture would need development in Victoria and twice sent J. L. Dew to America to study irrigation and agricultural methods. Syme also sent Alfred Deakin to India to report on irrigation there. As a result, the development of irrigation began which after some early failures was to be successfully extended in later years. Syme also supported early closing, anti-sweatshop legislation, and old-age pensions. When the issue of Federation became important towards the end of the century it was Deakin, a journalistic protégé of Syme's, who became the leader of the movement in Victoria. The ten Victorian delegates elected to the 1897 Federal Convention were the ten on the Age 'ticket'. During the first federal parliament Syme fought for comparatively high protective duties, but his influence did not extend to any great extent beyond Victoria and he was for the time unsuccessful. In later years, however, considerable increases in duties were made. In the last years of his life Syme wrote about the faults of party government. Some of these he had drawn attention to in chapter VII of his Representative Government in England ... (London, 1881). His suggested remedies have failed, however, to obtain much support.

Syme died at his home Blythswood in Kew near Melbourne on 14 February 1908. In 1859 he had married Annabella Johnson, who survived him with five sons and two daughters. Syme is buried at Kew Cemetery.

Evolution

Syme authored the book On the Modification of Organisms (1890) which aimed to disprove the theory of natural selection. Syme was not a creationist, he accepted the fact of evolution, but rejected Darwinism. Syme was an advocate of what he termed "cellular intelligence". He believed that the cell is a biological unit and a "vital entity" which could drive organic modifications. He held the view that modifications result from the action of the organism itself and not from the direct influence of the environment. Syme also criticized sexual selection and the Darwinian explanation for mimicry. The Dictionary of Australasian Biography (1892) noted that Syme's book "provoked warm opposition and attracted great attention."

In 1891, Alfred Russel Wallace negatively reviewed Syme's book in the Nature journal, stating that Syme had misrepresented Darwin's theory. Wallace concluded that "Mr. Syme has a considerable reputation in other departments of literature as a powerful writer and acute critic; but he has entirely mistaken his vocation in this feeble and almost puerile attempt to overthrow the vast edifice of fact and theory raised by the genius and the life-long labours of Darwin." Responding to Wallace in the Nature journal, Syme denied misrepresenting Darwin on natural selection.

The Dictionary of National Biography noted that Syme's book The Soul: A Study and an Argument (1903) "attacked both materialism and the current argument for design, and described Syme's own belief as a kind of pantheistic teleology."

Legacy
Syme wrote several books while owner of The Age: the first, Outlines of an Industrial Science, (London, 1876) is largely a vindication of protection and is also a plea for the extension of the activities of the state. Next appeared Representative Government in England ..., a study of the history of parliament in England. His next book On the Modification of Organisms (Melbourne, 1890), is a criticism of Darwin's theory of natural selection from an evolutionist position. Syme's last volume, The Soul: A Study and an Argument (1903), discusses the nature of life, instinct, memory, mind, and survival after death.

Syme also involved himself in  philanthropic activities; he paid the expenses of a rifle team to Bisley, Surrey and financed expeditions to New Guinea and Central Australia. In 1904 he gave £3000 to the University of Melbourne to endow the Syme Prize for research in biology, chemistry, geology and natural philosophy. The introduction of linotype machines threw many of Syme's compositers out of work; he ensured that they were provided for. The older men were pensioned off and others were set up in business or placed on the land.

Syme was hailed on his death as "one of the greatest men in colonial history" by his friend then Prime Minister Alfred Deakin.

The Age remained in family hands after Syme's death. It was headed by Sir Geoffrey Syme from 1908 to 1942 and Oswald Syme from 1942 to 1964 before eventually being passed to Ranald McDonald, David Syme's great-grandson, (Oswald Syme's grandson) who sold the Age to Fairfax in 1983. The Syme family controlled the newspaper outright for 127 years, from 1856 to 1983.

David Syme received no honours, having declined a knighthood in 1900. A knighthood for services to journalism and the Commonwealth was later presented to David Syme's son, Geoffrey in 1941.

Selected publications

Outlines of an Industrial Science (1876)
On the Modification of Organisms (1890)
The Soul: A Study and an Argument (1903)

References

Further reading

Stuart Macintyre. (1991). A Colonial Liberalism: The Lost World of Three Victorian Visionaries. Oxford University Press Australia.
Ambrose Pratt. (1908). David Syme: The father of Protection in Australia. Ward Lock & Co.
A lesser known story of the Syme family by Jessye Wdowin-McGregor

External links

 Sir Geoffrey Syme, David Syme's son, Managing Editor of The Age 1908–42. Also has a detailed page on David Syme's life.

1827 births
1908 deaths
19th-century Australian newspaper publishers (people)
Australian newspaper editors
Australian people of Scottish descent
Non-Darwinian evolution
Pantheists
People from North Berwick
Scottish emigrants to colonial Australia
Businesspeople from Melbourne